(born February 13, 1926) was a Japanese politician, and the former governor of Nagano Prefecture, in central Japan. Yoshimura was a graduate of the law faculty at the University of Tokyo. Upon graduation, he worked in the Nagano Prefectural Government Office. In 1971, he became deputy governor, and was elevated to governor in 1980 when the governor at the time, Gon'ichirō Nishizawa, suffered a cerebral hemorrhage. Yoshimura served five full 4-year terms, until October 26, 2000. Yoshimura retired from politics in 2000.

Yoshimura served as one of the four Vice Presidents of the Nagano Olympic Organizing Committee from 1991 and the Nagano Paralympic Organizing Committee President, when the committees was founded, until its final meetings in February 1999. At the June 15, 1991 97th IOC session in Birmingham, United Kingdom, Yoshimura was part of the Nagano Olympic Bid committee, where he spoke followed by Hironoshin Furuhashi, president of the Japanese Olympic Committee. In 1998, Yoshimura received the Silver Badge of the Olympic Order.

Gubernatorial elections

References

1926 births
2007 deaths
People from Nagaoka, Niigata
20th-century Japanese politicians
Governors of Nagano
1998 Winter Olympics
1998 Winter Paralympics